Essentia Health is an integrated healthcare system with facilities in  Minnesota, Wisconsin, and North Dakota. As of 2022 it has over 14,000 employees, including 2,125 physicians and credentialed practitioners. The network includes 14 hospitals, 70 clinics, six long-term care facilities, six assisted and independent living facilities, and one research & education institute. Essentia Health was accredited as an Accountable Care Organization by the National Committee for Quality Assurance in 2013.

History
Essentia Health was formed in 2004, as the parent company of the partnership between the Benedictine Health System and St. Mary's/Duluth Clinic Health System (SMDC). Essentia Health acquired Dakota Clinic/Innovis Health in January 2008.  In 2010, Essentia Health integrated the resources of all of its member organizations – SMDC Health System, Innovis Health, Brainerd Lakes Health, Essentia Community Hospitals and Clinics, and Essentia Institute of Rural Health – and united them under the one name, Essentia Health.    In 2022, Essentia Health acquired Mid Dakota Clinic.  In October 2022, Essentia Health and Marshfield Clinic Health System announced merger discussions. A Memorandum of Understanding was signed to evaluate how the two organizations might combine to form an integrated regional health system. 

Essentia Health has more than two dozen Catholic-sponsored clinics, hospitals, and other facilities. The roots of Essentia's Catholic facilities trace back to a group of Benedictine nuns who established St. Mary's Hospital, Essentia Health's oldest hospital, in Duluth in 1888.

Vision Northland 
In 2018, Essentia Health announced plans to build a new medical facility that would be replacing the current St. Mary's Medical Center in Duluth. The project was initially set at $800 million, but an additional $100 million was required to add an additional patient floor and outpatient care spaces. Changes in market conditions were also a cause for the increase.The estimated completion of the building is currently for early 2023, with an ETA to open in late 2023.

See also
 List of hospitals in Minnesota
 List of hospitals in North Dakota
 List of hospitals in Wisconsin

References

External links
Essentia Health website

Hospital networks in the United States
Healthcare in Minnesota
Healthcare in Wisconsin
Healthcare in North Dakota
Healthcare in Idaho
Catholic health care
Medical and health organizations based in Minnesota
Catholic hospital networks in the United States